Bashmanovo is a rural locality (a village) in Kubenskoye Rural Settlement, Kharovsky District, Vologda Oblast, Russia. The population was 11 as of 2002.

Geography 
Bashmanovo is located 18 km northwest of Kharovsk (the district's administrative centre) by road. Afonikha is the nearest rural locality.

References 

Rural localities in Kharovsky District